Vulturine may refer to:

 Vulturine guineafowl, the largest and most spectacular of the guineafowl bird family
 Vulturine parrot, a Neotropical parrot

See also

 Vulture (disambiguation)